Ignacio Huang (born January 1, 1980), is a Taiwanese actor and graphic designer based in Argentina. He is best known internationally for his role of Jun in the 2011 film Chinese Take-Away. Huang also appeared in Filmatrón in 2007 and  La canción del inmigrante in 2008. He also had a role in El Ratón Pérez 2. He co-starred in Charlotte alongside Ángela Molina.

His family emigrated from Taiwan to Paraguay, where they lived for eight years, before settling in Buenos Aires when he was eleven. He is a graduate of the University of Buenos Aires and later studied acting under Norman Briski. In addition to acting, Huang has performed glove puppetry, as well as taught ink painting and hosted cooking classes in Chinese and Taiwanese cuisine.

References

External links 

Argentine male film actors
Argentine male television actors
Male actors from Taipei
Taiwanese emigrants to Argentina
Place of birth missing (living people)
Living people
1980 births
21st-century Argentine male actors
21st-century Taiwanese male actors
Universidad Nacional de las Artes alumni
Male actors from Buenos Aires
Argentine graphic designers
Taiwanese puppeteers